Hill Grove is an unincorporated community in Pittsylvania County, in the U.S. state of Virginia.

See also
 Hill Grove School

References

Unincorporated communities in Virginia
Unincorporated communities in Pittsylvania County, Virginia